Allegro was a top restaurant in Prague Four Seasons hotel. It is now closed. In 2008 it became the first restaurant from the post-communist bloc to obtain the star from the prestigious Michelin Guide. In 2009, 2010 and 2011, Allegro retained its star.

It was the only restaurant in Prague with the accolade, although in 2010 a restaurant in Hungary was awarded the star, ending Allego's claim as the only restaurant from the Eastern Bloc to have the star.

The head chef was Andrea Accordi.

References

External links
 Official site
Michelin Guide starred restaurants in the Czech Republic
Defunct restaurants
Restaurants in Prague